The New World is a collection of short stories by Russell Banks. It was first published in 1978.

Contents
 "The Custodian" – first appeared in New Boston Review
 "The Perfect Couple" – Fiction International, nos. 6/7 (1976)
 "A Sentimental Education"
 "About the Late Zimma (Penny) Cate: Selections from Her Loving Husband's Memory Hoard" – TriQuarterly, Fall 1977
 "The Conversation" – Shenandoah, Fall 1977
 "The Rise of the Middle Class" – Canto, September 1977
 "Indisposed" – Matrix, June 1978
 "The Caul" – Mississippi Review, Spring 1978
 "The Adjutant Bird" – Lillabulero 1, no. 3 (July 1967)
 "The New World" – Ploughshares 3, no. 2 (1976)

See also

1978 in literature

References
Russell Banks, The New World, 1978. 

New World, The
New World, The
Books by Russell Banks